Kevin Francis Parker (born 2 May 1943) is a former Australian rules footballer who played with South Melbourne in the Victorian Football League (VFL). 

Originally from Colac, he played as a rover or back pocket

Notes

External links 

1943 births
Living people
Australian rules footballers from Victoria (Australia)
Sydney Swans players